The India International Challenge is an international badminton tournament, which is held annually in India. During its first two editions, it was a domestic tournament. Since 2010, it became an international tournament with the grading of International Challenge.

Previous winners

Performance by nation

See also
India Open
Syed Modi International Badminton Championships
Hyderabad Open
Odisha Open

References

Annual sporting events in India
Badminton tournaments in India
Recurring sporting events established in 2008